Eddie Smith (born February 8, 1984) is an American baseball coach who is currently the head coach at Utah Valley University, a role he has held since 2021. He was previously the hitting coach at Louisiana State University, where he earned the reputation of being one of the top hitting coaches in college baseball.

Head coaching record

College

Junior college

References

External links 
 
 Utah Valley profile

1984 births
Living people
Sportspeople from Olympia, Washington
Baseball players from Washington (state)
Baseball coaches from Washington (state)
Baseball infielders
Centralia Trailblazers baseball players
Notre Dame Fighting Irish baseball players
Virginia Cavaliers baseball coaches
Santa Clara Broncos baseball coaches
Notre Dame Fighting Irish baseball coaches
Lower Columbia Red Devils baseball coaches
Tulane Green Wave baseball coaches
LSU Tigers baseball coaches
Utah Valley Wolverines baseball coaches